Asfalto is a 2000 Spanish-French drama film directed by Daniel Calparsoro.

Cast 
 Najwa Nimri as Lucía
 Juan Diego Botto as Charly
 Gustavo Salmerón as Chino
 Alfredo Villa as Antonio
 Antonia San Juan as Clarita
  as Luis
 Javier Nogueiras as Paco
 Rubén Ochandiano as Miguel

References

External links 

2000 drama films
2000 films
Films directed by Daniel Calparsoro
Spanish drama films
French drama films
2000s French films